The Miles M.3 Falcon is a 1930s British three/four-seat cabin monoplane aircraft designed by Miles Aircraft Limited.

Design and development
The M.3 Falcon was a clean, single engined low-wing monoplane with trousered main undercarriage and fixed tail-wheel, designed in 1934. It was structurally similar to the earlier Miles M.2F Hawk Major family, but had side-by-side seating for two behind the pilot in a glazed cockpit. It was powered by a  de Havilland Gipsy Major piston engine. The prototype, G-ACTM, built by Philips and Powis first flew at Woodley Aerodrome on 12 October 1934.

The first production aircraft (designated M.3A Falcon Major) was flown in January 1935. It had a wider fuselage than the prototype to improve passenger comfort and revised glazing with a forward sloping windscreen. The M.3A was somewhat underpowered, so the (M.3B Falcon Six) and later versions were fitted with a  de Havilland Gipsy Six engine.

The M.3C Falcon Six was a four seater with dual controls. The M.3D was strengthened to allow an 11% increase in all up weight compared with the M.3B. The final versions were the M.3E and M.3F.

An enlarged five-seat version was developed as the M.4 Merlin.

Operational history
The prototype was fitted with extra fuel tanks and entered into the MacRobertson Race from England to Australia in October 1934. It took 27 days to reach Darwin, but returned in a record time of 7 days 19 hours 15 minutes, including one stage of  non-stop from Jodhpur to Basra.

Twenty-nine  M.3As and M.3Bs were delivered during 1935 and 1936 to private owners, clubs, and commercial operators in Britain and abroad.

In 1936 Rose, with the same aircraft, reduced the U.K to Cape passage record to 3 days 17 hours and 38 minutes.

Pre war, three Falcon Sixes appeared in RAF garb at the Royal Aircraft Establishment (RAE) for trials of a variety of wings and aerodynamic innovations. At the outbreak of the war three aircraft remained civilian as communications aircraft with various companies but, like so many civil aircraft ten others were impressed into service by the Royal Air Force, Royal Navy, the Royal Australian Air Force and the Swedish air force. Six Falcons survived the war, one of which was used by the RAE to test the wing of the Miles M.52.

Variants
Production numbers from 
M.3
Prototype three-seat version with a 130 hp de Havilland Gipsy Major engine. 1 built.
M.3A Falcon Major
Production four-seat version with a 130 hp de Havilland Gipsy Major engine. 18 built
M.3B Falcon Six
Three-seat version with a 200hp de Havilland Gipsy Six engine. 11 built, including 1 Falcon Six designated M.3, but not including 2 M.3Bs later converted to M.3E and F.
M.3C Falcon Six
Four-seater with dual controls with a 200 hp de Havilland Gipsy Six engine. 1 built.
M.3D
Strengthened variant with a 200 hp de Havilland Gipsy Six engine. 3 built. One was a converted M.3B.
M.3E
Variant with a 200 hp de Havilland Gipsy Six engine. 1 built but uncertified.
M.3F
A former M.3B modified for Fairey wing, spoiler and retractable aileron trials with the RAE, R4071.
Miles Gilette Falcon
A single aircraft modified for the M.52 program.

Civil operators
References 1 and 2 give detailed histories of the typically complicated lives of these small aeroplanes.

Military operators

Royal Australian Air Force 3 aircraft.

South African Air Force

Royal Swedish Air Force 1 aircraft.

Royal Aircraft Establishment 3 aircraft.
Royal Air Force 5 aircraft.
Royal Navy 1 aircraft.

Spanish Republican Air Force

Survivors
In Great Britain, G-AEEG, a privately owned M.3A based at The Shuttleworth Collection, Old Warden is on display at the Collection and flies regularly. It spent much of its life in Sweden as SE-AFW.
In Australia, M.3A VH-AAT is still airworthy with a private owner, based at Lilydale, Victoria.
In Spain, an M.3C registered EC-ACB is also active. This aircraft participated in the Spanish Civil War.

Specifications (M.3A)

See also
Miles M.52

References

Notes

Bibliography
Amos, Peter Miles Aircraft – The Early Years – The Story of F G Miles and his Aeroplanes, 1925–1939. Tonbridge, Kent: Air-Britain (Historians) Ltd, 2009. .
 

Cooper, Peter. Farnborough:100 years of British aviation.  Hinkley: Midland 2006.  
 Jackson, A.J. British Civil Aircraft since 1919, Volume 3. London: Putnam & Company Ltd., 1988. .
 Mondey, David. The Hamlyn Concise guide to British Aircraft of World War II. London: Chancellor press, 2002. .
 The Illustrated Encyclopedia of Aircraft (Part Work 1982–1985) Orbis Publishing

1930s British sport aircraft
Falcon
Single-engined tractor aircraft
Low-wing aircraft
Aircraft first flown in 1934